Over the Rainbow is a 2002 South Korean film starring Lee Jung-jae and Jang Jin-young.

Plot 
Weather presenter Jin-su is involved in a car accident, and though physically unhurt, he is left with a case of selective amnesia. Haunted by the memory of a woman he can't quite recall, he sets out to find her identity by revisiting some of his old college friends. The person giving him the most help is Jeong-hee, but as she helps him piece together his broken memories they start to develop feelings for one another, and Jin-su realizes that perhaps his forgotten past isn't worth chasing after all.

Cast 

Lee Jung-jae ... Lee Jin-su
 Jang Jin-young ... Kang Jeong-hee
 Jung Chan ... Choi Sang-in
 Uhm Ji-won ... Kim Eun-song
 Gong Hyung-jin ... Kim Young-min
 Kim Seo-hyung
 Choi Jae-won

References

External links 
 
 
 
 Review at Koreanfilm.org

2002 romantic comedy-drama films
2002 films
2000s Korean-language films
South Korean romantic comedy-drama films
2002 comedy films
2000s South Korean films